Alfred William Lamb (March 18, 1824 – April 29, 1888) was a U.S. Representative from Missouri.

Born in Stamford, New York, Lamb moved with his parents to Ralls County, Missouri in 1836. He attended Marion College in Ely, Missouri. He studied law, was admitted to the bar, and commenced practice in Hannibal, Missouri.

Lamb was elected as a Democrat to the Thirty-third Congress (March 4, 1853 – March 3, 1855). He declined to be a candidate for renomination in 1854 and resumed the practice of law.

He died in Hannibal, Missouri and was interred in Riverside Cemetery.

References

1824 births
1888 deaths
Democratic Party members of the United States House of Representatives from Missouri
People from Stamford, New York
19th-century American politicians